Tselovalnik (literally, "kisser", actually "sworn man"), was a common term for various officials in Muscovy elected by zemshchina (the population, as opposed to the tsardom's state apparatus) in uyezds and posads in various judicial, financial and police functions. The term is a contraction of the expression krestny tselovalnik, "the one who kissed the cross", in reference to the sworn oath accompanied with the kissing of the Holy Cross.

The history of this institution has two periods: before and after the Time of Troubles (early 17th century). During the former period tselovalniks acted independently, and afterwards  they served under the voivodes and the officials of various prikazes.

The term was first mentioned in the Sudebnik of 1497 and later in the statutory charters of Novgorod of Vasili III of Russia.

Nowadays, usage of the term often refers to its 19th-century meaning: under the Russian state alcohol monopoly, vodka sellers in taverns were commonly called tselovalniks because they gave a cross-kissing oath not to dilute vodka supplied from state-controlled distilleries and to sell it according to the demand.

References

Grand Duchy of Moscow
Obsolete occupations